Glosa (English: Glose or Gloss) is a poetic form that borrows lines from another, usually more famous poem and incorporates its text. The term originates from the practice of fifteenth century Spanish courtiers composing poems with a quatrain from a better-known poem and the repetition of a line from that quatrain at the end of a newly composed stanza. Most glosa contain an epigraph from the borrowed quatrain followed by four decima. Although it is not longer common in Spain, modern English examples exist including Marilyn Hacker's "Glose".

References 

Poetic forms